Spellbinder is an adventure game, released for the BBC Micro and Acorn Electron in 1987.

Plot 
The player takes the role of a Magelord, named Eldon the Spellbinder. His task is to find the evil Magelord outcast Zorn, in the castle of Lorraine, and defeat him by use of the so-called Ultimate Spell.

Gameplay 
The game is pseudo-3D, allowing the player to move left, right, forwards and backwards in a room, though not up and down. It was presented in a monochrome format, with black and one other colour being used to draw the sprites and backdrops, although the colour varied from room to room, illustrating the environments. A large number of items could be examined for clues, or searched for possible items. The game was relatively open-ended for a game of the time, similar to Exile, allowing the player to move around a large section of the castle right from the start, and start to mix various spells. A few of these spells were listed in the manual, but most had to be discovered from in-game clues.

Unusually, for a BBC Micro game, it has continuous background music: a version of Midnight Summer Dream, the 1983 song from British rock group The Stranglers' album Feline.

Development 
The game was written by Dan and Etan Shirron, two teenagers from Israel. They were 14½ and 16 when they started coding the game in 1986. The equipment used to write it was a memory monitor chip, a monochrome 14" TV, a cassette tape recorder and their own BASIC-written graphic-design software. The game was originally named Magelords, later to be named Spellbinder by Superior Software marketing team.

References

External links 
 Spellbinder review Electron User January 1988

1987 video games
Acornsoft games
Adventure games
BBC Micro and Acorn Electron games
BBC Micro and Acorn Electron-only games
Europe-exclusive video games
Role-playing video games
Single-player video games
Superior Software games
Video games about witchcraft
Video games developed in the United Kingdom
Video games set in castles